Roberta Temes is an American author and psychotherapist who specializes in hypnosis

Personal life
In May 1990, Temes married David Lyons, a retired university administrator. It was Temes' second marriage, and Lyons' third. Together they have three ex-spouses, seven children, 14 grandchildren and nine great-grandchildren.

Temes lives in Scotch Plains, New Jersey, and spends three months a year in Delray Beach, Florida.

References

1940s births
Living people
People from the Bronx
American non-fiction writers
American columnists
American psychotherapists
Year of birth missing (living people)
Journalists from New York City
American women non-fiction writers
American women columnists
Brooklyn College alumni
American advice columnists
21st-century American women